Eleutherodactylus interorbitalis, also known as the Sinaloa piping frog and spectacled chirping frog, is a species of frog in the family Eleutherodactylidae. It is endemic to Mexico and is known from the states of Sonora, Chihuahua, Sinaloa, and Durango. It tolerates deforestation as long as there are rocky areas available. Development is direct (i.e., there is no free-living larval stage). It can locally suffer from habitat deterioration but is not threatened overall.

References

interorbitalis
Endemic amphibians of Mexico
Fauna of the Sierra Madre Occidental
Amphibians described in 1956
Taxa named by Frederick A. Shannon
Taxonomy articles created by Polbot
Sinaloan dry forests